is a series of fighting video games dating back to 1985. They have been developed by Culture Brain and released for the arcades, NES, Super NES, Game Boy, Game Boy Color, PlayStation and Nintendo 64 platforms.

Games
The following is a list of games released in the series.

Other/cancelled games

References

Video game franchises
Culture Brain games